The 2015 Much Music Video Awards (MMVAs) were held on June 21, 2015 outside the Much headquarters in downtown Toronto. Ed Sheeran served as co-host for the show.

Nominations

Winners are shown in bold type.

Video of the Year
 Arcade Fire – "We Exist"
 Grimes f. Blood Diamonds – "Go"
 Majid Jordan – "Her"
 Kiesza – "Giant in My Heart"
 The Weeknd – "Often"

Best Post–Production
 Grimes f. Blood Diamonds – "Go"
 SonReal – "For the Town"
 Walk off the Earth – "Rule the World"
 Young Wolf Hatchlings – "You Lovely You"
 Zeds Dead f. Twin Shadow & D'Angelo Lacy – "Lost You"

Best EDM/Dance
 Grandtheft & Keys N Krates – "Keep It 100"
 Kiesza – "Giant in My Heart"
 Mia Martina f. Waka Flocka Flame – "Beast"
 Torro Torro – "Ca$hville"
 Zeds Dead f. Twin Shadow & D'Angelo Lacy – "Lost You"

Best Director
 Arcade Fire – "We Exist" Director: David Wilson
 Grandtheft & Keys N Krates – "Keep It 100" Director: Ohji
 Grimes f. Blood Diamonds – "Go" Directors: Claire Boucher & Mac Boucher
 Majid Jordan – "Her" Director: Common Good
 The Weeknd – "Often" Director: Sam Pilling

Best Pop Video
 Hedley – "Heaven in Our Headlights"
 Scott Helman – "Bungalow"
 Lights – "Running with the Boys"
 Shawn Mendes – "Something Big"
 The Weeknd – "Earned It"

Best Rock/Alternative Video
 Arcade Fire – "We Exist"
 Arkells – "Leather Jacket"
 Death from Above 1979 – "Virgins"
 July Talk – "Summer Dress"
 Nickelback – "Edge of a Revolution"

Best Hip Hop Video
 Tory Lanez – "Henny in Hand"
 Naturally Born Strangers – "No One Knows My Struggle"
 P Reign f. Drake & Future – "DnF"
 John River – "Hope City II"
 SonReal – "Preach"

Best MuchFact Video
 Death from Above 1979 – "Virgins"
 Grandtheft & Keys N Krates – "Keep It 100"
 Majid Jordan – "Forever"
 Lights – "Running with the Boys"
 Torro Torro – "Ca$hville"

Best International Video – Artist
 Nick Jonas – "Jealous"
 Rihanna, Kanye West and Paul McCartney – "FourFiveSeconds"
 Sia – "Chandelier"
 Hozier – "Take Me to Church"
 Kendrick Lamar – "i"
 Calvin Harris – "Blame"
 Ed Sheeran – "Thinking Out Loud"
 Sam Smith – "I'm Not the Only One"
 Taylor Swift – "Blank Space"
 Ariana Grande – "Break Free"

Most Buzzworthy International Artist or Group
 Iggy Azalea – "Black Widow"
 Jason Derulo – "Want to Want Me"
 Fall Out Boy – "Centuries"
 Ed Sheeran – "Thinking Out Loud"
 Sia – "Chandelier"

Most Buzzworthy Canadian
 Justin Bieber – "Confident"
 Drake – "Worst Behavior"
 Kiesza – "Sound of a Woman"
 Shawn Mendes – "Life of the Party"
 The Weeknd – "Earned It"

Fan Fave Video
 Hedley – "Heaven in Our Headlights"
 Marianas Trench – "Here's to the Zeros"
 Shawn Mendes – "Something Big"
 Nickelback – "Edge of a Revolution"
 The Weeknd – "Earned It"

Fan Fave Artist or Group
 Justin Bieber
 Drake
 Carly Rae Jepsen
 Shawn Mendes
 The Weeknd

Fan Fave International Artist or Group
 Selena Gomez
 One Direction
 Ed Sheeran
 Sam Smith
 Taylor Swift

Performers
Fall Out Boy – "Uma Thurman"
Carly Rae Jepsen – "I Really Like You"
Ed Sheeran – "Photograph"
Tori Kelly – "Nobody Love"
Scott Helman – "Bungalow"
Walk Off The Earth – "Rule the World"
The Weeknd – "The Hills"/"Earned It"
Mia Martina feat. Waka Flocka Flame – "Beast"
Shawn Mendes – "Stitches"
Nick Jonas – "Chains"
Ed Sheeran – "Thinking Out Loud"
Jason Derulo – "Want to Want Me"

Presenters
Sarah Hyland 
Tyler Posey 
Gigi Hadid
Hailee Steinfeld 
Bella Thorne 
Debby Ryan 
Cody Simpson
Echosmith
Nate Ruess
Francesco Yates
Adam Lambert
Shawn Hook
Lights
Arkells
Marianas Trench
Tyler Shaw
Dan Talevski

References

External links 

MuchMusic Video Awards
Much Music
2015 in Canadian music
2015 in Canadian television